Else Michelet (16 February 1942 – 3 May 2021) was a Norwegian journalist, satirical writer and songwriter.

Early and personal life
Michelet was born in Trondheim as a daughter of teacher Frans Oscar Michelet (1906–1984) and housewife Synnøve née Kulseng (1905–1981). The family moved to Bærum in 1947, and Michelet graduated from the University of Oslo with a cand.mag. degree in English, French and literature. From 1977 to 1979 she was married to Ingjald Ørbeck Sørheim.

Career
Michelet worked for the Norwegian Broadcasting Corporation from 1967; in the radio from 1973. She contributed to the entertainment programs Nitimen and Reiseradioen, and worked with the weekly satirical radio show Hallo i uken from 1990. She was its producer from 1993 to 2009.

She wrote several books: Sin egen herre: eventyr og annet ugress (1979), En annen historie (1981) and the novel Ariadnes tråd: et reiseliv (1988). Michelet was awarded the Fritt Ord Honorary Award in 2009, for her journalistic works in general, and particularly for developing the radio show Hallo i uken.

References

1942 births
2021 deaths
People from Trondheim
Writers from Bærum
University of Oslo alumni
Norwegian radio personalities
NRK people
Norwegian songwriters
Norwegian satirists
Norwegian women writers
Norwegian people of French descent
Women satirists
Norwegian Association for Women's Rights people